Daknai is a village in the Bhopal district of Madhya Pradesh, India. It is located in the Berasia tehsil.

Demographics 

According to the 2011 census of India, Daknai has 2 households. The effective literacy rate (i.e. the literacy rate of population excluding children aged 6 and below) is 71.43%.

References 

Villages in Berasia tehsil